"Solitary Thinkin'" is a song recorded by American country music artist Lee Ann Womack.  It was released in April 2009 as the second single from the album Call Me Crazy.  The song reached #39 on the Billboard Hot Country Songs chart.  The song was written by Waylon Payne.

Chart performance

References

2009 singles
2008 songs
Lee Ann Womack songs
Song recordings produced by Tony Brown (record producer)
MCA Nashville Records singles
Songs written by Waylon Payne